The 1966 United Kingdom general election in Northern Ireland was held on 31 March with 12 MPs elected in single-seat constituencies using first-past-the-post as part of the wider general election in the United Kingdom.

Results
The Ulster Unionists lost one seat to Gerry Fitt, leader of the new Republican Labour Party.

In the election as a whole, the Labour Party increased their majority and Harold Wilson continued as Prime Minister. The Conservative Party, which included the Ulster Unionists, were now led by Edward Heath.

MPs elected

By-elections

Footnotes

References

Northern Ireland
1966
1966 elections in Northern Ireland